Sougé, also known as Sougé-sur-Braye for disambiguation, is a commune in the French department of Loir-et-Cher, Centre-Val de Loire, France.

It is situated on the river Loir in the Loire Valley, Centre Region. The nearest town of more than 40,000 inhabitants is Tours.

History
In the time of the Romans, Sougé had a special importance because of his Roman's camp, called "Camp of Cesar" in the country. Today the fortifications are not visible any longer, but they were visible in the last century.

Geography
Sougé is a village in the department of Loir-et-Cher, there is 437 inhabitants.
The village of Sougé is near the village of Couture-sur-Loir (the village of Pierre de Ronsard) and the town of Montoire-sur-le-Loir.

Name
Sougé was called Silviacus (3rd and 8th century), then Selgiacus (11th century), Sugeium in 1216, Sougeium in the 13th century, paroisse des Roches de Sougé in 1595, Sougé-sur-Loir in 1675, Sougé-sur-Braye after the French Revolution, and now Sougé.

Population

Sights
The spacious church of St. Quintin has a barrel-vaulted roof and early twentieth century glass depicting amongst other themes Pope Leo XIII. There are traces of Renaissance architecture along the main (and almost only) street. The village cemetery contains Commonwealth graves.

See also
Communes of the Loir-et-Cher department

References

External links
 Official website

Communes of Loir-et-Cher